Huachenglu station is a station on Line 5 of Chongqing Rail Transit in Chongqing municipality, China. It is located in Jiulongpo District and opened in 2021.

Station structure

References

Railway stations in Chongqing
Railway stations in China opened in 2021
Chongqing Rail Transit stations